Radium is an unincorporated community in Greensville County, Virginia, United States. The community is located along Virginia Secondary Route 607, which runs north of the Norfolk Southern Railway's Franklin District.

References

Unincorporated communities in Greensville County, Virginia
Unincorporated communities in Virginia